was a town located in Nishikasugai District, Aichi Prefecture, Japan.

As of 2003, the town had an estimated population of 8,284 and a density of 2,065.84 persons per km². The total area was 4.01 km².

On October 1, 2009, Haruhi was merged into the expanded city of Kiyosu.

External links
 Kiyosu official website

References

Dissolved municipalities of Aichi Prefecture
Kiyosu, Aichi